Olavi Virta (originally to 1926 Oskari Olavi Ilmén) (27 February 1915 in Sysmä, Grand Duchy of Finland – 14 July 1972 in Pispala, Tampere, Finland) was a Finnish singer, acclaimed during his time as the "King" of Finnish tango. Between 1939 and 1966 he recorded almost 600 songs, many of which are classics of Finnish popular music, and appeared in many films and theatrical productions. Of his most acclaimed tangos are Punatukkaiselle tytölleni ("For My Red Haired Girl"), Ennen kuolemaa ("Before Death"; French: Avant de Mourir) and Täysikuu ("Full Moon"), while standouts from his other popular songs are Poika varjoisalta kujalta ("Boy From a Shady Alley"; Italian: Guaglione), Hopeinen kuu ("Silver Moon"; Italian: Guarda Che Luna), Eva and Kultainen nuoruus ("The Golden Youth"). He was also the second tenor of the quartet Kipparikvartetti in the early 1950s.

At the beginning of his career he received three gold records for the songs Ennen kuolemaa, Tulisuudelma (El Choclo) and La Cumparsita. Virta also acted in sixteen different Finnish films, including ones of the then-popular Pekka Puupää series. When he began his career in 1939, he was marketed as the "Bing Crosby of Finland." He has also been compared to the American singer-actor Frank Sinatra.

Virta was very much popular in the 1950s 
in Finland, however, around 1959 is when his life began to go into a bit of a sour direction. His wife Irene, whom he had three children with, left him and moved to Sweden in that year, he also began having health issues from an ever augmenting problem with alcoholism, diabetes, and a stroke. His career was officially off the ropes when it was cut short one night in 1962 when he was scandalously arrested for drunken driving in Ilomantsi, after which the press mockingly called him "The Singing Meatball." Ten years later he succumbed to alcoholism, living his final years in poverty. He was buried in the Malmi Cemetery.

His influence in contemporary Finnish music has not been forgotten, and today a number of Finnish Schlager singers cite him as a particular role model or influence when it comes to the realm of music. At least one movie, debuting in October 2018 and simply called, "Olavi Virta" has been produced about his life, as well as one documentary by Finnish film director and historian, Peter von Bagh. He was one of the ten people to be chosen by the upcoming Finnish Music Hall of Fame museum due to be opened in Helsinki.

Discography

(Post-mortem compilations)
1997: Suomiviihteen legendat
2005: Mestari - legendan ääni elää
2011: Arkistojen aarteita vol. 1
2013: Laulaja - Kaikki levytykset

References

External links
 
 Download МР3

1915 births
1972 deaths
People from Sysmä
People from Mikkeli Province (Grand Duchy of Finland)
20th-century Finnish male singers
English-language singers from Finland
Spanish-language singers
Finnish tango musicians
20th-century Finnish male actors